Wizard staff (also known as wisest wizard or wizard sticks or wizard) is a drinking game in which players play individually in an attempt to consume more beer than their opponents. As a player drinks, their current can of beer is taped to the top of their previous cans before being opened. It is then opened and consumed from the top of the staff, making the task more difficult as more beers are consumed, not only because of increased inebriation, but also because it simply becomes more physically challenging as the staff becomes taller. Once a staff is taller than its owner, that person has reached wizard status. At the end of the night, whoever has the longest staff or in other words, has consumed the most beer, may be declared the "wisest wizard".

Gameplay
After consuming a can, the player levels up and another can is duct taped on top of the first one. Each can consumed counts as one level, so upon finishing the first beer, the player becomes a Level 1 wizard (although, until the staff reaches their height, they are really classified as a wizard in training). At the beginning of the game, players decide on an interval to fight bosses (usually every 5 levels). These bosses are shots of hard liquor that are named after the liquor. For example, Boss Daniel's would be a shot of Jack Daniel's whiskey. Taking these shots is required to advance to the next level. The idea is to have multiple brands of hard liquor so that you can fight a different boss at each interval.

Variations
 White wizard variation: Once a player reaches level 10, they become a white wizard. When another player becomes a white wizard, they fight each other with their staffs. The wizard who breaks his opponent's staff becomes the new white wizard.
 "Feeling wise" variation: Players may not state that they are drunk, but must instead call it "feeling wise". If a player does say "drunk, intoxicated, etc.", that player must chug a beer and is not allowed to add it to the staff.
 Battle wizard variation: After completion of the 10 levels, all wizards remaining standing will have a 'staff fight' with their wizard staffs.  The wisest wizard (first to 10) will typically win, as their staff is the largest and strongest.

Origin
Games of wizard staff were recorded during Anti Hero + Girl Skateboards "Beauty and the Beast" Tour in May 2008, although the game is thought to have originated closer to the early 2000s.

See also

 List of drinking games

References

External links
 
 
 , a music video depicting the game being played

Drinking games